Robert Noel Lendrum (born 22 March 1948) is a former New Zealand rugby union player. A fullback, Lendrum represented Counties at a provincial level, and was a member of the New Zealand national side, the All Blacks, in 1973. He played three matches for the All Blacks including one international. He was briefly coach of the Counties team in 1995.

References

1948 births
Living people
People from Waiuku
People educated at Papakura High School
New Zealand rugby union players
New Zealand international rugby union players
Counties Manukau rugby union players
Rugby union fullbacks
New Zealand rugby union coaches